Nicholas James Drake-Lee (7 April 1942 – 22 January 2021) was a rugby union prop who played 73 games for Leicester Tigers between 1962 and 1968; he represented England 8 times between 1963 and 1965.  He was a Cambridge University blue between 1961 and 1963.

Drake-Lee made his Leicester debut against Bath on 6 January 1962 and played 10 times that season.

He was a member of the Cambridge University rugby team in their undefeated 1961 season winning 14 games including the Varsity Match. Before Cambridge, he was a Rugby Vice-Captain at Stonyhurst College.

Drake-Lee made his international debut for England on 19 January 1963 against Wales at Cardiff. He played in all four games as England won the 1963 Five Nations Championship.

References

1942 births
2021 deaths
England international rugby union players
English rugby union players
Leicester Tigers players
Rugby union props
Cambridge University R.U.F.C. players
Lancashire County RFU players
Rugby union players from Kettering